Sharlon Romans Emederio Schoop (born April 15, 1987) is a Curaçaoan professional baseball shortstop for L&D Amsterdam of the Honkbal Hoofdklasse. He played for Team Netherlands in the 2019 European Baseball Championship, and at the Africa/Europe 2020 Olympic Qualification tournament in Italy in September 2019.

Career 
Schoop was signed by the San Francisco Giants as an undrafted free agent on March 30, 2004. Schoop played in the Giants minor league system from 2005 to 2011, reaching as high as the Double-A Richmond Flying Squirrels in 2010. On November 2, 2011, Schoop elected free agency. On November 25, 2011, Schoop signed a minor league contract with the Kansas City Royals organization. He spent the entire 2012 season with the Double-A Northwest Arkansas Naturals, slashing .267/.341/.436 with 7 home runs and 19 RBI in 50 games. He did not appear in a game in 2013 due to injury and elected free agency on November 4, 2013. The Baltimore Orioles signed Schoop to a minor league contract on November 21, 2013.

In 2014, Schoop spent the season with the Double-A Bowie Baysox, hitting .217/.288/.300 with 3 home runs and 25 RBI in 77 games. He split 2015 between Bowie and the Triple-A Norfolk Tides, hitting a combined .219/.280/.263 in 81 games.

Schoop came to Baltimore in June 2016 in case the team needed to add him to the roster during the suspension of infielder Manny Machado, but he was never officially recalled off the taxi squad and was later sent back to Triple-A Norfolk. In January 2017, Schoop signed a minor league contract with the Orioles. He elected free agency on November 6, 2017. 

On February 20, 2018, Schoop re-signed to a minor-league deal with the Baltimore Orioles. He elected free agency on November 2, 2018.

On May 25, 2019, Schoop signed with the L&D Amsterdam of the Honkbal Hoofdklasse. He played 19 games for the club in 2019, slashing .357/.427/.486 with 1 home run and 15 RBI. Schoop played in 15 games for the team in 2020, batting a torrid .350/.451/.600 with 2 home runs and 17 RBI.

International career
Schoop represented the Netherlands at the 2009 World Baseball Classic in San Juan, Puerto Rico and Miami, Florida.

He played for Team Netherlands in the 2019 European Baseball Championship, at the Africa/Europe 2020 Olympic Qualification tournament in Italy in September 2019, and at the 2019 WBSC Premier12.

Personal life
His brother, Jonathan, is also a baseball player, and is currently with the Detroit Tigers.

References

External links

1987 births
2009 World Baseball Classic players
2017 World Baseball Classic players
2019 European Baseball Championship players
Augusta GreenJackets players
Arizona League Giants players
Bowie Baysox players
Connecticut Defenders players
Curaçao baseball players
Curaçao expatriate baseball players in the United States
Living people
Northwest Arkansas Naturals players
Norfolk Tides players
People from Willemstad
Richmond Flying Squirrels players
Salem-Keizer Volcanoes players
San Jose Giants players
L&D Amsterdam Pirates players
2023 World Baseball Classic players